Winning Colors (March 14, 1985 – February 17, 2008) was an American Hall of Fame Champion Thoroughbred racehorse and one of only three fillies to ever win the Kentucky Derby. Though she was registered as roan, she was, in fact, a gray with a white blaze on her face.

Background
Winning Colors was bred by Echo Valley Farm near Georgetown, Kentucky owned by Donald & Shirley Sucher. The couple had previously bred the Hall of Fame filly,  Chris Evert. During her racing career she was owned by Eugene V. Klein and trained by D. Wayne Lukas.

Her sire, Caro, was a top-class performer (rated 133 by Timeform), whose wins included the Poule d'Essai des Poulains, Prix Ganay and Prix d'Ispahan, before becoming a very successful breeding stallion. Caro's other progeny included Madelia, Crystal Palace, Cozzene Theia and Siberian Express. Winning Colors dam, All Rainbows won seven races and finished third in the Delaware Oaks. and was also a half-sister to Chris Evert.

Racing career

1987: two-year-old season
Racing on the West Coast of the United States for trainer D. Wayne Lukas, Winning Colors won both of her starts at age two.

1988: three-year-old season
In the spring of 1988, the large filly won the Santa Anita Derby, defeating colts her age by 7½ lengths. Sent to Churchill Downs for the Kentucky Derby, she was up against a stellar field of colts including Risen Star, Seeking the Gold, Forty Niner, Regal Classic, and co-favorite Private Terms. As was her habit, Winning Colors broke fast and raced to the lead. Although Forty Niner made a charge in the homestretch, she held him off to win by a neck.

In the Preakness Stakes, the second leg of the U.S. Triple Crown, Winning Colors finished third to Risen Star, who then won the 1½ mile Belmont Stakes by fifteen lengths while Winning Colors finished out of the money.

In the fall of 1988, Winning Colors finished second to Ogden Phipps' filly Personal Ensign in the Maskette Stakes. The two fillies next met in the Breeders' Cup Distaff at Churchill Downs. Winning Colors had the lead with 10 yards to go when Personal Ensign, who had struggled throughout the race because of the sloppy track, rallied and won by what the U.S. Racing Hall of Fame describes as a "lip." After the race, Winning Colors' trainer, D. Wayne Lukas, said that she had run the best race of her career.

1989: four-year-old season
In 1989 Winning Colors raced in her final campaign at age four and won two of her seven races and came ninth in the Breeders Cup Distaff, in a season hampered by breathing difficulties and surgery.

Assessment and honors
Winning Colors was voted the 1988 Eclipse Award for Outstanding 3-Year-Old Filly.

In 2000, Winning Colors was inducted into the United States' National Museum of Racing and Hall of Fame.

Retirement
As a broodmare, Winning Colors produced ten foals and six winners:

Shbakni, a brown filly, foaled in 1991, sired by Mr Prospector. Failed to win in 14 races.
Minden Rose, gray filly, 1992, by Mr Prospector. Won one race.
Golden Colors, bay filly, 1993, by Mr Prospector. Won three races.
Danzig Colors, bay filly, 1994, by Danzig. Won three races.
Stormin Winnie, gray filly, 1995, by Storm Cat. Unraced.
Will Will Win, chestnut colt, 1996, by Rahy. Won three races in South Africa.
Northwest Colors, bay filly, 1998, by Broad Brush. Won one race.
Dr Litin, gray colt, 1999, by Broad Brush. Failed to win in three races.
Ocean Colors, gray filly, 2006, by Orientate. Won three races.
Silver Colors, gray filly, 2007, by Mr Greeley. Failed to win in four races. Dam of Eskimo Kisses, winner of the 2018 Alabama Stakes.

Winning Colors was euthanized February 17, 2008, at the age of 23 as a result of complications from colic. She was in foal to Mr. Greeley. She is buried at Greentree Farm, a division of Gainesway Farm near Lexington, Kentucky.

Pedigree

See also
 List of historical horses

References

New York Times article about Personal Ensign and the 1988 Breeders' Cup Distaff
Winning Colors at the United States' National Museum of Racing and Hall of Fame

1985 racehorse births
2008 racehorse deaths
Racehorses bred in Kentucky
Racehorses trained in the United States
Kentucky Derby winners
Eclipse Award winners
United States Thoroughbred Racing Hall of Fame inductees
Thoroughbred family 23-b